In Pwyll Pendefig Dyfed, the first branch of the Mabinogi, Hefeydd Hen (or Heyfedd the Old) was the father of Rhiannon.

Hefeydd Hen, according to legend, tried to force his daughter Rhiannon to be married against her will to Gwawl. She met Pwyll of Dyfed and fell in love, planning to marry in one year and one day at his court on his estate. In accordance with the plan, they tried to marry but were thwarted by Clud and his son Gwawl. They put the wedding off for a further year. Pwyll and Rhiannon then went to Hefeydd's court; he dressed as a beggar, asking for food. By a trick, Gwawl was captured and killed and Hefeydd was forced to allow Rhiannon to marry Pwyll in his court and then let her to return to Arberth.

Heyfedd Hir (Hir meaning "long" in Welsh, but also referring to distance in time), is mentioned as one of the Seven Knights left to take charge of the Island of Britain when Bran went to rescue his sister in the second branch of the Mabinogi. He is also to be found in the 6th century epic poem Y Gododdin where the word "Hir" is used to describe no less than seven individuals.

References

Welsh mythology
Mabinogion